This is a list of Gujarati language films that released in 2017.

January–March

April–June

July–September

October–December

References

External links
 List of Gujarati films of 2017 at the Internet Movie Database

2017
Gujarati
Gujarati